The 2022–23 DePaul Blue Demons men's basketball team represented DePaul University during the 2022–23 NCAA Division I men's basketball season. They were led by second-year head coach Tony Stubblefield and played their home games at Wintrust Arena in Chicago, Illinois as members of the Big East Conference.

On January 10, 2023, DePaul defeated Villanova for the first time since 2008, snapping a 22-game losing streak to the Wildcats over 15 years.

Previous season
The Blue Demons finished the 2021–22 season 15–16, 6–14 in Big East play to finish in 10th place. They lost in the first round of the Big East tournament to St. John's.

Offseason

Departures

Incoming transfers

2022 recruiting class

Roster

Schedule and results 

|-
!colspan=12 style=| Regular season

|-
!colspan=12 style=|Big East tournament

Source

References

DePaul Blue Demons men's basketball seasons
DePaul
DePaul